Prawns may refer to either of two groups of crustaceans:
Dendrobranchiata, including genera such as Penaeus, Sergestes and Acetes
More generally, it may be used for shrimp and prawns

Prawn may also refer to:
Prawn, an extraterrestrial race in the film District 9
Prawn (band), American indie rock band
King Prawn (band), a UK ska band
Parktown prawn, Libanasidus vittatus, a species of cricket

See also
Pawn (disambiguation)
Shrimp (disambiguation)